Thun is a railway station in the town of Thun, in the Swiss canton of Bern. At the station, the Swiss Federal Railways owned Bern to Thun main line makes a junction with the other lines, all owned by the BLS AG. These lines are the Gürbetal line from Bern via Belp, the Burgdorf to Thun line from Burgdorf via Konolfingen, and the Lake Thun line to Spiez and Interlaken.

The station is served by various operators, including the BLS AG, Swiss Federal Railways (SBB) and Deutsche Bahn.

The station also provides an interchange with the local bus network provided by the Verkehrsbetriebe STI. Ships of the BLS-owned fleet on Lake Thun serve a quay at the station, which they access via a navigable stretch of the Aare and the Thun ship canal.

Services
The following services stop at Thun:

Most northbound trains terminate in Basel; a single EuroCity continues to Hamburg-Altona and two ICEs continue to Berlin Ostbahnhof.
 EuroCity / InterCity: trains every two hours between Basel SBB and Brig; EuroCity trains continue from Brig to  via .
 Bern S-Bahn:

References

External links 
 
 
Interactive station plan (Thun)

Railway stations in the canton of Bern
Transport in Thun
Swiss Federal Railways stations